Tapinoma nigerrimum is a species of ant in the genus Tapinoma. Described by Nylander in 1856, the species is endemic to Africa and Europe.

References

Tapinoma
Hymenoptera of Africa
Hymenoptera of Europe
Insects described in 1856